John Muckler (April 13, 1934 – January 4, 2021) was a professional hockey coach and executive, who last served as the general manager of the Ottawa Senators of the National Hockey League (NHL). Muckler had over 50 years of professional hockey experience as a part owner, general manager, director of player personnel, director of hockey operations, head coach, assistant coach and player. He had been a part of five Stanley Cup championships in various roles with the Edmonton Oilers.

Bio
Born in Midland, Ontario in 1934, and raised in Paris, Ontario, Muckler was a defenceman in the minor leagues for 13 seasons, playing the bulk of his career in the Eastern Hockey League (EHL).

Muckler began his professional coaching career as a player/coach in 1959 with the EHL's New York Rovers. He then spent the next 20 years in off-ice positions with the New York Rangers, Minnesota North Stars and Vancouver Canucks before joining the Edmonton Oilers organization in 1981. During those 20 years, Muckler served briefly as head coach of the North Stars in 1968–69, and won multiple regular-season titles, playoff championships and league coach-of-the-year honours in the minor leagues. For his successes, The Sporting News named him the top coach in minor-league hockey in 1979.

While with the Oilers, Muckler served as an assistant coach with the Stanley Cup winners under head coach/general manager Glen Sather in 1984 and 1985. After the 1984-85 season, Sather began splitting most coaching duties with Muckler, who was named assistant head coach. He won two more Cups in 1987 and 1988. When Sather relinquished his coaching duties in 1989, Muckler was promoted to head coach and led the club to its fifth Stanley Cup in seven years in 1990.

In 1991, Muckler left the Oilers organization and was hired by the Buffalo Sabres. Initially the club's director of hockey operations, he soon accepted the team's head coaching position and guided the Sabres for the next four seasons. He also assumed the role of Sabres' general manager in 1993. A finalist for the Jack Adams Award as NHL coach of the year in 1994, Muckler stepped down from coaching in 1995 to focus on his front-office duties and was named "NHL Executive of the Year" by The Sporting News for the 1996–97 season. Sabres President Larry Quinn fired Muckler in the 1997 offseason.

Muckler's last coaching position was as head coach of the New York Rangers from 1998 to 2000. His career coaching record is 276–288–84, combined with a 233–167–53–7 career record as an NHL general manager, and he has been involved in more than 2,000 professional games in varying roles. His résumé also includes three appearances at the National Hockey League All-Star Game and two appearances (1984 and 1987) on the coaching staff of the Canada Cup-winning Team Canada.

Muckler joined the Ottawa Senators as general manager in June 2002, and presided over what was arguably the team's most successful period. The team ultimately reached the Stanley Cup finals in 2007 but lost to the Anaheim Ducks in a five-game series. Despite this success, the Senators announced that Muckler had been fired on June 18, 2007. Head coach Bryan Murray was promoted to replace him.

Muckler was hired as a senior advisor with the NHL's Phoenix Coyotes in September 2008.

In addition to his many years coaching and managing in the NHL, Muckler was also an assistant coach for the Canadian teams that won the 1984 and 1987 Canadian Cup tournaments.

Death
Muckler died in Buffalo on January 4, 2021. 

Muckler is survived by his wife, Audrey, four children and nine grandchildren.

Career statistics

Playing statistics

NHL coaching statistics

References

External links
 

1934 births
2021 deaths
Arizona Coyotes personnel
Baltimore Clippers (1954–56) players
Buffalo Sabres coaches
Buffalo Sabres executives
Charlotte Clippers players
Cleveland Barons (1937–1973) coaches
Edmonton Oilers coaches
Greensboro Generals (EHL) players
Long Island Ducks (ice hockey) players
Minnesota North Stars coaches
National Hockey League general managers
New York Rangers coaches
Ottawa Senators general managers
People from Midland, Ontario
Stanley Cup champions
Stanley Cup championship-winning head coaches
Vancouver Canucks (WHL) players